Charak Puja or Charak Mela  (also known as Cadak, Chadak, Nil Puja or Hajrha Puja) is a Hindu folk festival held in honor of the deity Shiva. The festival is observed in the Indian state of West Bengal, and in Bangladesh on the last day of the month of Chaitra (Choitro in the Bengali calendar) at midnight.

People believe that by satisfying Shiva, the festival will bring prosperity to them, eliminating the sorrow and sufferings of the previous year.

The preparation usually starts a month in advance. The people responsible for the arrangement of the festival go from village to village to procure the necessary components like paddy, oil, sugar, salt, honey, money and other items needed for the ritual. At midnight of Songkranti, the worshippers gather to worship Shiva and Ma Durga for success. Afterwards a puja, the prasad (Items blessed by the deity) are distributed.

Rarely, it’s also known as "Hajrha Puja". Women fast before this festival and  male devotees swing from a pole with hooks being attached to the pole with ropes thrust through their backs.

Charak Puja in Bangladesh
In Bangladesh, it is frequently takes place at Moulvibazar, Thakurgaon district, and Galachipa Upazila of the Patuakhali District. Goalkhali, Gabua, Haridebpur, Lalua, Lohalia, and other villages are well known for "Charak Puja". Though the aristocracy and fluency of the festival is being deemed now, it is still being performed rarely by people with an uncommon amount of devotion. For them it’s a part of their life. The Most popular festival "Charak Puja" found at places like Dholar Haat, Akcha, Gorea, Khochabari(Singia), Hothath para at Thakurgaon Sadar, same places of Tripura Dhalai District like Kamalpur and Kulai.

Bagad and Sirimanu

In Maharashtra Bagad (Marathi language: बगाड) in Andhra pradesh Sirimanu festival  is a religious festive tradition, where a ceremonial pole from an  auspicious tree is venerated. In some villages, jatras in honour of local deities in Maharashtra & Andhra Pradesh are performed. Bagad is a similar concept to Charak Puja, Gajan (festival) or Indian parallel of Mexican Danza de los Voladores.

See also
 Banawadi#Banawadi Bagad
 Gajan (festival)
 Danza de los Voladores
 Sirimanothsavam

References

External links

 Janakantha "by Shankar Lal Dash, 13 April 2008

Hindu festivals
Religious festivals in India
Religious festivals in Bangladesh